The River Bride is a river in counties Cork and Waterford in Ireland. It is a tributary of the Munster Blackwater. The English poet Edmund Spenser is reputed to have written part of his poem "The Faerie Queene" on the banks of the Bride in the Conna area. The river runs through the baronies of Barrymore and Imokilly. The river is tidal up to Tallow Bridge.

References

Rivers of County Cork
Rivers of County Waterford